Elmer Roy Smith (December 24, 1913 – September 14, 1989) was a carpenter and political figure in Ontario. He represented Parry Sound in the Legislative Assembly of Ontario from 1943 to 1945 as a Co-operative Commonwealth member.

He was born in Parry Sound, the son of George Lionel Smith and Marguerite Leavens, and was educated there. In 1937, Smith married Beatrice Merrill Johnston.

References

External links

1913 births
1989 deaths
Ontario Co-operative Commonwealth Federation MPPs
20th-century Canadian politicians